Caro is a surname. Notable people with the surname include:

Abraham ben Raphael Caro, Turkish rabbi
Alberto Caro (born 1937), Venezuelan chess master
Annibale Caro (1507–1566), Italian poet
Anthony Caro (1924–2013), British sculptor
Antonio Caro (1950–2021), Colombian conceptual artist
David Caro (c.1782–1839), German pedagogue
Elme Marie Caro (1826–1887), French philosopher
Esperanza Elena Caro (1906–1985), Spanish embroiderer
Ezekiel Caro (1844–1915), German rabbi and historian
Heinrich Caro (1834–1910), German industrial chemist, first described peroxymonosulfuric acid, or 'Caro's acid' 
Horatio Caro (1862–1920), British chess player
Isaac ben Joseph Caro (1458–1535), Spanish rabbi
Isabelle Caro (1982–2010), French actress
Jane Caro (born 1957), Australian commentator, author and academic
José María Caro Martínez (1830–1916), Chilean politician, first Mayor of Pichilemu
José María Caro Rodríguez (1866–1958), Chilean Cardinal of the Roman Catholic Church
Joseph Caro (1488–1575), rabbi, scholar, and author of the Shulchan Aruch
Joseph Chayyim Caro (1800–1895), Polish rabbi
Julio de Caro (1899–1980), Argentine tango musician
Marc Caro (born 1956), French filmmaker
Mike Caro (born 1944), American professional poker player and instructor
Niki Caro (born 1966), New Zealand film director, producer and screenwriter
Nikodem Caro (1871–1935), German industrial chemist, co-inventor of the Frank-Caro process to produce calcium cyanamide
Nydia Caro (born 1948), Puerto Rican singer and actress
Omari Caro (born 1991), Jamaican–English rugby player
Pauline Cassin Caro (1828/34/35 - 1901), French novelist
Rafael Caro Quintero (born 1952), Mexican drug lord
Robert Caro (born 1935), American journalist and biographer
Steve Martin Caro (1948–2020), American singer

See also

Cari (name)
Carlo (name)
Caro (given name)
Charo (name)